Edgar J. DaSilva (21 August 1941 – 28 October 2007) was an Indian microbiologist whose passion for the practical application of his subject had driven him to champion biotechnology in developing countries around the world.

DaSilva joined the United Nations Educational, Scientific and Cultural Organization (UNESCO) in 1974; and rose to be head of its Life Sciences section, as his foresight and perception of science in the global context allowed him to be proactive in identifying scientific priorities and developing new and appropriate thrusts for UNESCO's program actions.

Leadership role in Culture Collections and Biotechnology 
He was instrumental in the planning and implementation of several UNESCO regional and international programmes in applied microbiology and biotechnology as well in the development of global networks dealing with the management and use of microbial resources and training opportunities in the fields of marine and plant biotechnology. He was a co-founder of the Microbiological Resource Centres (MIRCEN) all around the world and played a major role in the establishment of the Biotechnology Action Countil (BAC). Through these two programmes he made a considerable contribution to the development of  biotechnology research and training worldwide.

Intergovernmental Activities 
DaSilva's knack for developing strong links with international programs for co-ordinated action on topics of common interest led to his strong support for the International Organization of Biotechnology and Bioengineering (IOBB), built strong links with the World Federation for Culture Collections (WFCC), played an important role in the conferences on the Global Impact of Applied Microbiology (GIAM) among many others. In addition, he mobilized several extra-budgetary programs in close cooperation with UNEP and UNDP and donor member states for activities in national development in biotechnology and regional cooperation in microbiology.

Biotechnology Transfer 
During his time with UNESCO, DaSilva honed his passion for teaching and knowledge transfer in his own area of specialization of microbiology and also in biotechnology. He worked tirelessly to develop training initiatives and set up fellowship and professorship programs to stimulate scientific exchange. He was a strong proponent of international scientific collaboration as a means to promote development and aid provide developing countries with the tools to drive their own scientific research.

Encyclopedia for Life Support Systems 
Most recently, he was co-editor of the "Biotechnology" theme for the UNESCO-sponsored Encyclopedia of Life Support Systems (EOLSS)

Edgar J Da Silva died in Mumbai, India.

References

External links 
DaSilva appreciation note, Electronic Journal of Biotechnology
Developing biotechnology around the world, Nature Biotechnology 17,434 - 436 (1999)
GMOs and Development, Electron. J. Biotechnol. v.4 n.2 Valparaíso ago. 2001
The Encyclopaedia of Life Support Systems
IC Biotech, The International Centre for Biotechnology
Indian Ministry of Education records on UNESCO fellowships
UNESCO Database of DaSilva papers

1941 births
Indian microbiologists
2007 deaths